Biedes is one of six parishes (administrative divisions) in Las Regueras, a municipality within the province and autonomous community of Asturias, in northern Spain.

The population is 279 (INE 2011).

Villages
 Biedes
 La Estaca (L'astaca)
 La Braña
 Marinas (Mariñes)
 Meobra (Miobra)
 Parades
 Recastañoso

Parishes in Las Regueras